Manuel "Manolín" Bueno Cabral (born 5 February 1940) is a Spanish retired professional footballer who played as a forward.

Club career
The son of a former goalkeeper, also named Manuel (1910–1970), Bueno was born in Seville, Andalusia, and started playing with Cádiz CF in Segunda División.

In 1959, the 19-year-old signed with Real Madrid, where he would remain for the following 11 campaigns. Behind Francisco Gento in the queue for selection at both club and international level, Bueno featured infrequently for the Whites, never appearing in more than nine league games in any season except his last, where he also scored a career-best seven goals to help the side to a fourth-place finish. Despite this, the club itself credits him with eight Primera División titles, as well as two national cups and two European Cups, though he did not take part in any of the finals (he did play in one leg of their 1960 Intercontinental Cup victory). He left  Real Madrid in the summer of 1971 with competitive totals of 119 matches and 27 goals.

He retired from the professional game at the end of 1972–73 after two years – one spent in each major level – with hometown club Sevilla FC.

Honours
Real Madrid
European Cup: 1959–60, 1965–66
Intercontinental Cup: 1960
La Liga: 1960–61, 1961–62, 1962–63, 1963–64, 1964–65, 1966–67, 1967–68, 1968–69
Copa del Generalísimo: 1961–62, 1969–70

References

External links

Stats and bio at Cadistas1910 

1940 births
Living people
Spanish footballers
Footballers from Seville
Association football forwards
La Liga players
Segunda División players
Cádiz CF players
Real Madrid CF players
Sevilla FC players
Spain under-21 international footballers
Spain B international footballers